The 2021 Southern Illinois Salukis football team represented Southern Illinois University Carbondale as a member of the Missouri Valley Football Conference (MVFC) during the 2021 NCAA Division I FCS football season. Led by sixth-year head coach Nick Hill, the Salukis compiled an overall record of 8–5 with a mark of 5–3 in conference play, placing in a three-way tie for third in the MVFC. Southern Illinois received an at-large berth in the NCAA Division I Football Championship playoffs, where they beat South Dakota in the first round before losing to the eventual national champion, North Dakota State in the second round. The team played home games at Saluki Stadium in Carbondale, Illinois.

Schedule

References

Southern Illinois
Southern Illinois Salukis football seasons
2021 NCAA Division I FCS playoff participants
Southern Illinois Salukis football